Founders Circle Capital is a growth capital firm based in the San Francisco Bay Area. Founders Circle Capital invests in private companies and specializes in growth stage investments providing preferred stock and common stock (sometimes referred to as employee liquidity or direct secondaries) purchases, institutional liquidity and other unique structures to founders and long-term employees. The company has also developed a private executive leadership community called The Circle for growth stage CFOs and CEOs to share professional development knowledge and resources with their peers.

History
Founders Circle Capital was founded in 2012 by Ken Loveless, a former managing director of SVB Capital, and Mike Jung, previously a JPMorgan Partners Principal. 
In February 2014, the firm closed its first $195 million venture capital fund, FCC Fund I.
In July 2016, the firm began investing from its second $208 million fund.
By January 2021, the firm closed on FCC Fund III, a $355 million fund. The three funds bring the firm's assets under management to $1 billion.

Investments
Founders Circle has invested in over 40 companies since 2012, amongst others: Adaptive Insights, Anaplan, Carbon Black,DocuSign, Elemental, Kabam, Twilio Pinterest, and Ticketfly. Founders Circle Capital has invested in more than 73 startups, of which 13 have gone public and 19 have been acquired.

See also
Venture Capital 
Private Equity Secondary Market

References

Financial services companies established in 2012
Venture capital firms of the United States
Private equity secondary market